Shakespeare by the Lakes is a summer festival of Shakespeare plays performed in Australian Capital Territory (ACT) public parks beside Lake Tuggeranong, Lake Burley Griffin, in Canberra's city centre and next to the Queanbeyan River.
Based on New York's Shakespeare in the Park festivals, Shakespeare by the Lakes was conceived and founded by Taimus Werner-Gibbings in 2017. Each year, the hosting theater company Lakespeare & Co. (formed by Werner-Gibbings and collaborators Duncan Driver, Lexi Sekuless and Paul Leverenz) produces free performances of Shakespearean texts in multiple locations, attracting over 5,000 patrons.

Completed Seasons

Reception

Free of charge to for the general public, Shakespeare by the Lakes is financed by donations from local and federal government agencies, corporate sponsors, crowd-funding prior to the performances, and donations collected during the performances.
The performances have consistently been well-received by critics and audiences alike, lauded by reviewers and audiences for being at the forefront of an emerging, 'proud yet self effacing culture' in post-centenary Canberra, by presenting 'Shakespearean comedy as it was meant to be, fun-filled entertainment for every age,' which makes it an 'authentic and relatable way to treat the bard we so often revere but rarely embrace.'

Spin-offs
In 2019, Shakespeare Down the Pub was conceived by Werner-Gibbings as an informal spin-off from Shakespeare by the Lakes (adapted from another United States Shakespeare performance concept, Shakespeare in the Bar) and was presented successfully by Lakespeare & Co. at the George Harcourt Inn in Canberra without scenery, props, stage-lighting or microphones while the audience ate, drank and shouted at the cast.

References

Australian Capital Territory
Shakespeare festivals